Neuwied is a town in the north of the German state of Rhineland-Palatinate, capital of the District of Neuwied. Neuwied lies on the east bank of the Rhine, 12 km northwest of Koblenz, on the railway from Frankfurt am Main to Cologne. The town has 13 suburban administrative districts: Heimbach-Weis, Gladbach, Engers, Oberbieber, Niederbieber, Torney, Segendorf, Altwied, Block, Irlich, Feldkirchen, Heddesdorf and Rodenbach. The largest is Heimbach-Weis, with approximately 8000 inhabitants.

History

Near Neuwied, one of the largest Roman castra on the Rhine has been excavated by archeologists. Caesar's Rhine bridges are believed to have been built nearby. 

Neuwied was founded in 1653 by Count Frederick III. of Wied, initially as a fortress on the site of the village of Langendorf, which had been destroyed in the Thirty Years' War (1618–1648). It was to serve as the new residence of the lower county, secure its only access to the Rhine and enable the small state, impoverished in the war, to participate in Rhine trade. However, since the place hardly attracted any settlers due to its unfavourable location in a frequently flooded area, the counts of the House of Wied, especially Frederick III, Frederick William and John Frederick Alexander pursued a policy of self-administration and extensive religious tolerance in the town - unlike in the rest of their territory. This liberties led to the immigration of numerous religious refugees from other German territories, but also from France and Switzerland, and to a rapid increase in the population. From the middle of the 18th century, members of seven religious communities lived in Neuwied: Calvinists, to which the count's house also belonged, Lutherans, Catholics, Mennonites, Inspirationalists, Moravian Brethren and Jews.

The refugees and their descendants contributed significantly to the economic upswing of the town in the 18th and 19th century. Handicraft products by the cabinetmakers Abraham and David Roentgen, who belonged to the Moravian Brethren, or the Mennonite clockmaker Peter Kinzing were found at almost all important courts of Europe between Versailles and St. Petersburg. Thanks to the foundation of the Rasselstein iron rolling mill by Count John Frederick Alexander, Neuwied was one of the first industrial locations in Germany.

On 18 April 1797 the French army, led by General Louis Lazare Hoche, defeated the Austrians under General Franz von Werneck at the Battle of Neuwied.

Neuwied is the native town of paternal ancestors of John D. Rockefeller, traced to the 16th century and possible French Huguenot refugees. His father's line emigrated to the North American colonies, arriving in New York in 1710, the year of a massive immigration of nearly 2800 Palatine Germans refugees, whose transportation costs from London were covered by Queen Anne's British government. Neuwied was also the birthplace of William of Wied, who briefly held the title of King of Albania in 1914.

Geography
Parts of the 86.5 square kilometre area are divided into the suburban districts of:

 Altwied
 Block
 Engers
 Feldkirchen
 Gladbach
 Heimbach-Weis
 Irlich
 Niederbieber
 Oberbieber
 Rodenbach
 Segendorf
 Torney

The core of Neuwied and the former village of Heddesdorf, which belonged to the municipality before these districts were added, are not listed as districts themselves.

Since the inner city of Neuwied is situated on a former bed of the river Rhine, it is at great risk of flooding. It is one of very few towns in the region protected by flood-prevention levees, a source of friction with communities downstream.

Neuwied is twinned with the London Borough of Bromley.

Politics
The 2019 municipal council elections led to the following distribution of seats: CDU (15), SPD (12), Greens (7), AfD (5), FWG (3), FDP (2), The Left (2), Ich tu's (2).

Population
Originally there were only a few thousand people living in Neuwied with the number not growing significantly because of wars and famines. With the industrialization in the 19th century the number of inhabitants increased from 5,600 in 1831 to 18,000 in 1905.

By 1970 the figure had grown to 31,400 and following a major realignment incorporating several communities within the town, it jumped to 63,000.

As of 30 June 2005 there were officially 66,455 people living in Neuwied.

Infrastructure

Neuwied is connected to the German network of Bundesstraßen (national routes) (here: B9, B42 and B256). The Autobahnen (motorways) A3, A48 and A61 are quickly reachable from Neuwied.

Public transport
Within the bounds of Neuwied are two railway stations, Neuwied and Engers on the Right Rhine line, and a third station is under consideration by the state agency for northern commuter railway services (SPNV Nord), which is responsible for the service on the railway lines connecting to Koblenz Hauptbahnhof in the south and Köln Hauptbahnhof in the north. Via either of those stations, the German high-speed rail network and the InterCity network are accessible. Daytime service includes
 a Deutsche Bahn hourly semi-fast train (Regional-Express), the Rhein-Erft-Express, running Koblenz-Engers-Neuwied-Cologne-Mönchengladbach and back,
 and a Deutsche Bahn hourly all-stops service (Regionalbahn) Koblenz-Neuwied-Cologne-Stommeln(-Mönchengladbach) and back, which is also available in the evening hours.
 A VIAS hourly semi-fast train (StadtExpress) Neuwied-Koblenz-Lahnstein-Wiesbaden(-Frankfurt) and back, running also in evening hours.

It takes about 15 to 20 minutes to travel to Koblenz while Cologne is about 70 to 80 minutes away, Mainz 90 to 120 minutes, direct connection to Frankfurt is around 150 minutes, sometimes faster when changing to the IC/ICE network.

Public transport within Neuwied relies on a bus network, offering (depending on line) 20, 30 or 60-minute schedules, the majority of lines are served by Transdev.

All public transport (road and rail) is integrated into the Verkehrsverbund Rhein-Mosel public transport association. Tickets are valid for all service, restricted by time and fare zones. For more information on timetables see .

Twin towns – sister cities

Neuwied is twinned with:
 Bromley, England, United Kingdom
 Drom HaSharon, Israel
 Güstrow, Germany
 Suqian, China

Notable people

Hermann of Wied (1477–1552), archbishop-elector of Cologne, reformer
Gotthard Rockenfeller (1590–1695), ancestor of John D. Rockefeller
Louis-François Metra (1738–1804), French journalist
De Beaunoir (1746–1823), French playwright
David Roentgen (1743–1807), cabinetmaker
Peter Kinzing (1745–1816), watchmaker and mechanic
Johannes Baptista von Albertini (1769–1831), Bishop of Moravian Church
Prince Maximilian of Wied-Neuwied (1782–1867), naturalist, botanist, ethnologist
Philipp Wilhelm Wirtgen (1806–1870), botanist
Hermann, Prince of Wied (1814–1864), nobleman
Elisabeth of Wied (1843–1916), Queen of Romania and poet
William, Prince of Wied (1845–1907), nobleman, officer and politician
Ferdinand Hueppe (1852–1938), Co-founder of the DFB and sports medicine
Paul Reichard (1854–1938), African researchers
Friedrich von Ingenohl (1857–1933), admiral, commander of the imperial High Seas Fleet in World War I
Ferdinand Siegert (1865–1946), pediatrician
Carl von Moers (1871–1957), horse rider
Wilhelm, Prince of Albania (1876–1945), sovereign prince of Albania
Carl Einstein (1885–1940), writer, art historian and critic
Friedrich Wolf (1888–1953), doctor and writer
Walter Kaiser (1907–1982), footballer 
Horst Siebert (1938–2009), economist
Klaus Rudolf Werhand (1938–2009), metalsmith and coppersmith
Renate Freund (born 1939), writer
Monika Kropshofer (born 1952), painter and photographer
Jörg Bewersdorff (born 1958), mathematician
Thomas J. Kinne (born 1961), translator, author and quiz player
Helmut Dieser (born 1962), Roman Catholic bishop in Aachen
Ulf Mark Schneider (born 1965), manager and CEO of Nestlé
Martin Werhand (born 1968), publisher, editor and writer
Ferris MC (born 1973), musician, rapper and actor
Christian Ulmen (born 1975), entertainer and actor
Simon Kirch (born 1979), track and field athlete
Mike Rockenfeller (born 1983), race car driver
Tobias Nickenig (born 1984), footballer
Tobias Hegewald (born 1989), racing driver
Hasan Ali Kaldırım (born 1989), Turkish footballer
Anna-Lena Friedsam (born 1994), tennis player
Isaac Bonga (born 1999), basketball player

See also
Synagogue District, Neuwied

References

Sources

External links

Populated places on the Rhine
Neuwied (district)
Middle Rhine